This is a list of notable monastics within the Thai Forest Tradition, also known as the Kammaṭṭhāna Tradition.

Bhikkhus

Dhammayuttika Nikāya

Mahā Nikāya

Sīladhārās

Thai Forest Tradition